Okstindan is a mountain range which lies in the inner Helgeland district in Nordland county, Norway.  It is located within the municipality of Hemnes.  The mountain Oksskolten is part of the Okstindan range, and it is the highest mountain in North Norway. Other mountains in the range include Okstinden, Okshornet, Vesttinden, and Bessedørtinden. Between these mountains lies the large glacier Okstindbreen.  The Swedish border lies just to the east of the mountains.

The most common starting point for tours of the Okstindan mountains is from the Leirskardalen valley or from the lake Kjennsvannet in Hemnes.

Media gallery

References

Landforms of Nordland
Mountain ranges of Norway